Stéphane Dumont (born 6 September 1982) is a French professional football manager and former player who played as a midfielder. He is currently the head coach of Ligue 2 club Guingamp.

Playing career

Lille 
Born in Seclin, Dumont started his career at Lille in 2003. He came to the forefront thanks to the departure of Benoît Cheyrou. Having signed his first contract during the 2002–03 season, he enjoyed a good start to the season before a broken ankle led to a season of merely training and little else. Claude Puel, who was then the coach of Lille, decided to use Dumont as a backup for Mathieu Bodmer and Jean Makoun in midfield. He played for Lille over the eight seasons until 2011, a year in which the team won the league title, making 138 appearances and netting 9 goals.

Monaco 
On 18 July 2011, Dumont moved to the relegated Ligue 2 club Monaco on a three-year contract. On 15 July 2013, Dumont and Monaco agreed to mutually terminate their contract. Dumont subsequently retired.

Managerial career 
From 2015 to 2017, Dumont worked as an assistant manager for Lille, his former club. He occupied the same type of role with Reims from 2017 to 2021. On 27 May 2021, he was appointed head coach of Ligue 2 club Guingamp on a two-year contract with an option for a third year in case of a promotion to Ligue 1.

Honours

Player 
Lille
Ligue 1: 2010–11
Coupe de France: 2010–11

References

Sources
 Dumont, symbol of Lille OSC
 

1982 births
Living people
People from Seclin
French footballers
Association football midfielders
Lille OSC players
AS Monaco FC players
Ligue 1 players
Ligue 2 players
Sportspeople from Nord (French department)
French football managers
Lille OSC non-playing staff
En Avant Guingamp managers
Stade de Reims non-playing staff
Association football coaches
Footballers from Hauts-de-France